The 1942 United States Senate elections were held November 3, 1942, midway through Franklin D. Roosevelt's third term as president. The 32 seats of Class 2 were contested in regular elections, and two special elections were held to fill vacancies.

Although this election took place during World War II, the opposition Republican party made major gains, taking eight seats from the Democrats and one from an independent. The Democrats nonetheless retained a significant majority, though the smallest since Roosevelt was first elected in 1932.

The New York Times ascribed the results to "voters' dissatisfaction with the conduct of the war, both at home and abroad" but not evidence of a lack of enthusiasm for the war effort. It found that a candidate's stance as isolationist or interventionist before Pearl Harbor had little impact on his success at the polls. The paper's editorial board welcomed a return to normal political alignments after the unbalanced majorities of the previous decade. The election not only changed the numbers of Democrats and Republicans in the Senate, but also accomplished an ideological shift, as several longtime enthusiastic supporters of the New Deal were replaced by Republicans of the most conservative sort.

The Republicans gained enough seats to end the Democrats' supermajority control.

Results summary 

Colored shading indicates party with largest share of that row.

Source:

Gains, losses, and holds

Retirements
One Republican and three Democrats retired instead of seeking re-election.

Defeats
Ten Democrats and one Independent sought re-election but lost in the primary or general election.

Change in composition

Before the elections
At the beginning of 1942.

Election results

Race summaries

Special elections during the 77th Congress 
In these special elections, the winner was seated during 1942 or before January 3, 1943; ordered by election date.

Races leading to the 78th Congress 
In these regular elections, the winners were elected for the term beginning January 3, 1943; ordered by state.

All of the elections involved the Class 2 seats.

Closest races 
Eleven races had a margin of victory under 10%:

There is no tipping point state

Alabama

Arkansas

Colorado 

There were 2 elections in Colorado.

Colorado (regular)

Colorado (special)

Delaware

Georgia

Idaho

Illinois

Iowa

Kansas

Kentucky

Louisiana

Maine

Massachusetts

Michigan

Minnesota 

There were two elections to the same seat due to the August 31, 1940 death of Farmer–Laborite Ernest Lundeen.  Republican Joseph H. Ball was appointed October 14, 1940 to continue the term, pending the special election.  Ball was elected to the next term in the regular election, but not to finish the current term in the special election.

Minnesota (special)

Minnesota (regular)

Mississippi

Montana

Nebraska

Nevada (special)

New Hampshire

New Jersey

New Mexico

North Carolina

Oklahoma

Oregon

Rhode Island

South Carolina

South Dakota

Tennessee

Texas

Virginia

West Virginia 

There were 2 elections to the same seat due to the January 12, 1941 resignation of Democrat Matthew M. Neely who was elected Governor of West Virginia.  Democrat Joseph Rosier was appointed January 13, 1941 to continue the term, pending the special election.  Primaries for both races were held August 4, 1942.

West Virginia (special) 

Interim Democrat Joseph Rosier easily won the primary, but lost the special election to finish the term that would end in January 1943 to former congressman and 1936 senate nominee Hugh Ike Shott.

West Virginia (regular) 

Neither Shott nor Rosier were candidates in the regular election.  Instead, governor (and former senator) Neely ran to reclaim his seat, having regretted leaving the Senate.

Neely won the Democratic primary but lost the regular election.

At the end of the term, Revercomb would lose re-election to Neely in 1948.  He then won a special election to the other seat in 1956.

Wyoming

See also 
 1942 United States elections
 1942 United States gubernatorial elections
 1942 United States House of Representatives elections
 77th United States Congress
 78th United States Congress

Notes

References 

 
United States home front during World War II